Kenneth "Ken" Ulman (born May 4, 1974) is an American attorney, founder and CEO of a consulting firm, Margrave Strategies, and former Democratic politician in Howard County, Maryland. Prior to working in the private sector, Ulman served as county executive for Howard County from 2006 to 2014. He also represented the 4th district as a County Council member from 2002 to 2006. Ulman previously worked in the office of Maryland Governor Parris Glendening as liaison to the Board of Public Works and secretary to the Cabinet.

Early life and education 
Born May 4, 1974, in Columbia, Maryland, to Diana and Louis "Lou" Ulman, Ken Ulman grew up in Columbia and attended Centennial High School. His father is a lawyer and former chairman of the Maryland Racing Commission, which oversees horse racing and off-track betting in Maryland. A three-time cancer survivor, his brother, Douglas Ulman, founded the  during college and was CEO of the Lance Armstrong Livestrong Foundation from 2007 to 2015.

While attending college at University of Maryland, College Park, Ulman studied government and politics and interned at the White House. He received a bachelor's in 1997 and was admitted to Georgetown Law School. He initially joined his father's law firm taking cases on a contract basis before entering local politics in 2002.

Political activity 
Ulman worked on campaigns to elect Bill Clinton in 1996, Maryland Governor Parris Glendening in 1998, and Kathleen Kennedy Townsend in 2002.
Ulman first ran for political office in 2002, when he sought the district 4 County Council seat that was being vacated by Mary Lorsung. Ulman won the Democratic primary by 50 votes and beat Republican opponent, Joan Lancos, in the general election. Ulman served a four-year term as a Council member in Howard County.

In 2006, Ulman ran for county executive against Republican Party opponent Christopher Merdon and Independent candidate C. Stephen Wallis. A major theme of Ulman's campaign was his claim he played a role in preventing the closure of Columbia's Merriweather Post Pavilion. Ulman won in the general election with 52% of the vote and was sworn in on December 4, 2006, at age 32, becoming the youngest person in Maryland to be elected as county executive. During his tenure as county executive, Ulman served as chairman of the Baltimore Regional Transportation Board and the Baltimore Metropolitan Council. He was also on the board of directors of the Maryland Association of Counties and County Executives of America.

On June 3, 2013, Ulman announced that he would be running in 2014 for lieutenant governor of Maryland as the running mate of gubernatorial candidate and incumbent lieutenant governor, Anthony Brown. After being defeated by the Republican ticket of Larry Hogan and Boyd Rutherford, Ulman left public office in December 2014 at the end of his term as Howard County Executive and founded a consulting firm, Margrave Strategies.

Election history

References

External links 
 . Howard County, Maryland official website. Archived from the original on February 26, 2012.

1974 births
Georgetown University Law Center alumni
State cabinet secretaries of Maryland
Living people
Maryland lawyers
Maryland Democrats
People from Columbia, Maryland
University of Maryland, College Park alumni
Howard County Executives